Alberto Casañal Shakery (1875–1943) was a Spanish poet, playwright, humorist and writer.

A native of San Roque, Cádiz, he moved to Zaragoza as a child and lived there for the rest of his life. He graduated in Physics and Chemistry and was Professor of Mathematics at the Industrial School of Zaragoza. He began to compose verses in great abundance, particularly romances, and collected traditional Aragonese and Castilian songs and wrote numerous stories and short pieces of comic theater. His works were usually set in Aragon with strong regionalist flavor, sometimes in collaboration with his friend Pablo Parellada. He collaborated on the  La Gran Vía, Barcelona Cómica, Pluma y Lápiz  and other publications.

Selected works

Theatre
La tronada
Angelistos al cielo
Los tenderos
La hora fatal
Los chicos de los pobres
La paga de alivio
Los pícaros estudiantes
Con Pablo Parellada, Historia cómica de Zaragoza, La justicia de Almudévar  Recepción académica, Cambio de tren y El gay saber

Verses
Fruslerías, versos, 1898
Romances de ciego, 1910
Versos de muchos colores, 1912
Jotas, en colaboración con Sixto Celorrio, 1912
Cantares baturros
Fruta de Aragón. Versos Baturros
Romance, Vida y Retrato De Ramón Laborda (El Chato)

Narrative
Cuentos baturros, 1898, 1900
Mostilladas, cuentos
Una boda entre baturros, novela festiva en verso

Others
Baturradas
Más baturradas, 1903
Nuevas baturradas. Monólogos y diálogos baturros
Epistolarlo baturro
Nuevo libro de los Enxemplos
De Utebo a Zaragoza
Gramática parda y otras picardías

References

Spanish dramatists and playwrights
Spanish male dramatists and playwrights
Spanish poets
Spanish humorists
1875 births
1943 deaths
People from San Roque, Cádiz
People from Zaragoza
Spanish male poets